Chandrakant Chiplunkar Seedi Bambawala is an Indian situational comedy television series that aired on SAB TV.
It starred Prashant Damle, Kavita Lad and Anang Desai.

The story follows Chandrakant Chiplunkar, a fire brigade employee of the Maharashtra State Government, who is living in a middle-class society.

Cast
 Prashant Damle as Chandrakant Gangaram Chiplunkar
 Kavita Lad as Hemali Chandrakant Chiplunkar (née` Mehta)
 Anang Desai as Hasubai Mehta
 Suneet Surana as Ranjeet Kamlesh Kadakia
 Shashikant Dwivedi as Gangaram Chiplunkar
 Naina Apte as Suhasini Gangaram Chiplunkar 
 Drisha as Sonali 
 Ashish Juneja as Aditya Chandrakant Chiplunkar
 Sareeka Dhillon as Sania Meerchandani
 Akash Nath

References

External links
 Chandrakant Chiplunkar Seedi Bambawala official Site on SAB TV
 Chandrakant Chiplunkar Watch Official Video Streaming Online at Sony LIV

Sony SAB original programming
2014 Indian television series debuts
Indian television sitcoms
2014 Indian television series endings
Fictional firefighters